Eisenstein may refer to:

 Bayerisch Eisenstein, (until 1951 just Eisenstein) a village and a municipality in the Regen district, in Bavaria, Germany
 Eisenstein (Ore Mountains), a mountain in Saxony, Germany
 Eisenstein, Wisconsin, a town in the United States
 Eisenstein (surname)
 Gotthold Eisenstein, German mathematician
 Odile Eisenstein, French chemist 
 Sergei Eisenstein, Soviet filmmaker and theorist
 Eisenstein (film), a 2000 Canadian biography of Sergei Eisenstein
 Eisenstein, a fictional spacecraft in The Flight of the Eisenstein by James Swallow

See also 
 Einstein (disambiguation)